Gaiki may refer to the following places in Poland:
Gaiki in Gmina Jerzmanowa, Głogów County in Lower Silesian Voivodeship (SW Poland)
Other places called Gaiki (listed in Polish Wikipedia)